Fort Paull was a gun battery situated on the north bank of the Humber, near the village of Paull, downstream from Hull in northern England.

History
Batteries have been built at Paull by Henry VIII, Charles I during the  Civil War during the siege of Hull and the Napoleonic Wars. The first fort built on the site was started in 1542 with a capacity for 12 guns. The current fort is of pentagonal design and was built in 1861–4 and on the recommendations of the Royal Commission, hence it is one of the Palmerston Forts.

Armament
The original emplacements, nineteen 64-pounder (29 kg) RML artillery pieces were concealed or demolished in 1894 when concrete emplacements for three 6-inch Breech Loading (BL) guns on hydropneumatic carriages and two 4.7-inch Quick Firing (QF) guns were built. A mining station was added in 1886 and searchlights followed in 1907. The three 6-inch gun positions were remodelled after 1902 to newer Mark VII types on central pivot mountings.

At the outset of the First World War, Paull was judged too close to Hull, so was disarmed when new forts were built at Sunk Island and Stallingborough. The fort was used as a training base between the wars, and during the Second World War, it was converted into a magazine to serve the Russian convoys; a degaussing station was also added.

Present day

In 1960, Fort Paull was released from the Ministry of Defence and closed down. In 1964, a group of volunteers, the Friends of Fort Paull took over the site and began to restore the fort as a heritage museum. Fort Paull finally opened to the public in 2000. Fort Paull houses a waxwork museum showing figures which have influenced the fort's long history as well as an armoury showing various artillery pieces and armoured vehicles. The fort also plays hosts to various military re-enactments from time to time.

Fort Paull is the location of the last remaining complete Blackburn Beverley heavy transport aircraft.

In January 2020, it was announced that the attraction would not be opening for the 2020 season.

The museum's contents were auctioned on 19 September 2020. The contents auction raised a six-figure sum, the Blackburn Beverley bringing £21,000.

Gallery

References

External links

 Fort data sheet

Tourist attractions in the East Riding of Yorkshire
Buildings and structures in the East Riding of Yorkshire
Paull
Paull
Paull
Military history of the East Riding of Yorkshire
Military and war museums in England
Museums in the East Riding of Yorkshire